The saliva-tongue-1 RNA motif is a conserved RNA structure that was discovered by bioinformatics.
saliva-tongue-1 motif RNAs are found in metagenomic sequences isolated from human saliva or on the human tongue.  So far (as of 2018), these RNAs have not been detected in a classified organism.

saliva-tongue-1 RNAs likely function in trans as small RNAs.

References

Non-coding RNA